Ulsda (Gronings: Olsde) is a hamlet in the municipality of Oldambt in the northeast of the Netherlands.

Between 1887 and 1938 there was a railway stop in Ulsda. Ulsda was home to 44 people in 1840. Nowadays, it consists of a handful of houses.

References 

Oldambt (municipality)
Populated places in Groningen (province)